Beatrix Boulsevicz (born February 15, 1987 in Budapest) is a butterfly swimmer from Hungary, who won the gold medal in the 200 m butterfly at the European SC Championships 2005. She is trained by Attila Selmeczi.

Boulsevicz competed at the 2004 and 2008 Summer Olympics.

References

External links 
 
 
 

1987 births
Living people
Hungarian female swimmers
Hungarian female butterfly swimmers
Olympic swimmers of Hungary
Swimmers at the 2004 Summer Olympics
Swimmers at the 2008 Summer Olympics
Swimmers from Budapest
20th-century Hungarian women